The Belgian Fabrique Nationale d’Armes de Guerre (National Manufacturer of War Weapons) company, also sometimes known as Fabrique Nationale de Herstal (National Manufacturer at Herstal), but better known simply as "FN" or "Fabrique Nationale" was founded at Herstal on the edge of Liège in 1889. As well as weapons, it was for many years a manufacturer of motorbikes and of automobiles.

This summary concerns the automobiles.   FN was active as an auto-manufacturer from 1899 till the later 1930s which makes it Belgium's longest-lived make of car.

History
The first FN automobile was built in 1900. It was called a "Spider" but to modern eyes more closely resembles a horseless carriage. It featured a two cylinder motor which drove the rear wheels using a chain linkage. A  four cylinder 4,000 cc engined car followed in 1904, with a claimed power output of 14 PS (10 kW). This car already included an angled steering column. The next year saw the arrival of the more luxurious FN Typ 30-40. Customers included members of the Belgian Royal family and the Shah of Persia.

Th FN 6900 was developed from the Typ 30-40, powered by an engine built under license from Rochet-Schneider. In the engine car the cylinders were cast in pairs. Power transferred to the rear axle via a disc clutch and a steel drive-shaft. The car was designed for comfort, with suspension that used both laterally and longitudinally mounted leaf springs.

With the FN Typ 2000, the car also gained flexible engine mountings. This was followed by the Typ 2700 which, for the first time, was powered by engines designed and built by FN themselves.

Automobile production resumed after the First World War, and the Typ 2700a, now equipped with an electric starter, a tachometer and "automatic" chassis lubrication. The engine was constructed largely of aluminium. Further model introductions were the FN Typ 1950, and improved FN Typ 1250A and, later, the FN 1250T with a fully functioning electrical system, a four cylinder engine producing 15 PS (11 kW) and a three speed transmission.

The FN Typ 1250 was followed by the FN Typ 1300, available in 3 different version designated "A", "B" or "C". Technically all were identical, but with differing wheelbases and equipment levels. They were powered by a 4-cylinder 1327 cm³ engine with a side-mounted camshaft and overhead valves. The cars were delivered with wide low-pressure "Balloon" tyres, and four wheel brakes. The range was later broadened with the arrival of the FN Typ 1300D with four speed transmission, followed by the Typ 1300E with a widened track and the FN Typ 1300Sp developed for sports driving. The model was very successful.

The FN Typ 2150 was, by the standards of the time and place, a mid-range automobile with a four cylinder engine of approximately 1.5 litres and four speed transmission. At the top of the range came the FN Typ 3800 which was produced only in very small numbers. However, a strengthened Typ 3800 chassis formed the basis of a small truck.

1927 saw the launch of the FN 10CV which was built for three years.   It was replaced in 1930, amidst celebration of the manufacturer's first thirty years as an auto-maker, by the FN 11CV, a technically well equipped car noted for its sporty driving characteristics.   A delivery van based on the 11CV was also available.  Higher up in the hierarchy of the market place, FN were also at this time offering a prestigious eight cylinder car.

The successor to the FN 11CV appeared in 1931 in the form of the FN 11CV 1625 which, despite still being within the same 11CV car tax band, boasted a larger engine.   By the start of the 1930s FN were producing 16 different models which led to economic difficulties.   Therefore from 1930 only two new models were built.   These were named after the king's eldest grandson and his baby brother, the "FN Prince Baudouin" und the "FN Prince Albert".   The two cars shared the same 11CV engine but featured different bodywork.

Vehicle manufacturing after the end of passenger car production 
After passenger car production came to an end the company continued to be active as a motor-bike producer till the mid 1960s.  Commercial vehicle production also continued till after the war, and FN was building trolleybuses until the early 1960s.

Further reading 
 Automobil und Motorradchronik, Vol 11/1976
 Yvette Kupélian, Jacques Kupélian und Jacques Sirtaine: Histoire de l’automobile belge. Paul Legrain, Brüssel,  und e.p.a., Paris,  (in French)
 G. N. Georgano: Autos. Encyclopédie complète. 1885 à nos jours. Courtille, 1975 (in French)

See also 
FN (motorcycle)
FN Herstal

References

Car manufacturers of Belgium
Defunct motor vehicle manufacturers of Belgium
Cars powered by Knight engines
Vintage vehicles
Vehicle manufacturing companies established in 1889
Herstal
Belgian brands
Belgian companies established in 1889